Wesley Carroll (born September 6, 1967) is a former American football wide receiver in the National Football League. He played three years for the New Orleans Saints and Cincinnati Bengals.

1967 births
Living people
Players of American football from Cleveland
American football wide receivers
Northwest Mississippi Rangers football players
Miami Hurricanes football players
New Orleans Saints players
Cincinnati Bengals players